Vincent Broderick may refer to:

 Vince Broderick (1920–2010), English cricketer
 Vincent Broderick (musician) (1920–2008), Irish musician and composer
 Vincent L. Broderick (1920–1995), American federal judge